Copionodon lianae is a species of catfishes (order Siluriformes) of the family Trichomycteridae. It is found in the Grisante River, a tributary of the Mucujê River, which is a tributary of the Paraguaçu River in Bahia, Brazil.

Etymology
The catfish is named in honor of ichthyologist Liana Figueiredo Mendes, of the Universidade Federal do Rio Grande do Norte in Brazil, who collected the type specimens.

References

Trichomycteridae
Fish of South America
Fauna of Brazil
Catfish genera
Freshwater fish genera
Taxa named by Carla Marques Campanario
Taxa named by Mário Cesar Cardoso de Pinna
Fish described in 2000